The Gasometer Oberhausen is a former gas holder in Oberhausen, Germany, which has been converted into an exhibition space. It has hosted several large scale exhibitions, including two by Christo and Jeanne-Claude. The Gasometer is an industrial landmark, and an anchor point of the European Route of Industrial Heritage and the Industrial Heritage Trail. It was built in the 1920s, and reconstructed after World War II.

History
In the 1920s the coal and steel industry in the Ruhrgebiet produced blast furnace gas and coal gas as a by-product of iron production and coking, while the steel industry as well as coking used large amounts of these gasses or alternative fuels. As supply and demand of gas varied independently, sometimes excess gas had to be flared off, while at other times additional fuel had to be purchased. The Gasometer was built as a buffer: storing excess gas and releasing it again when demand exceeded production.

The Gasometer was built by Gutehoffnungshütte, by the side of the Rhine-Herne Canal. Construction started 27 February 1927 and cost 1.74 million Reichsmark. A framework of 24 steel girders was built on a concrete base, and a skin of 5mm thick sheet metal was riveted to the framework. Inside, a 1,207,000 kg pressure disc was mounted which could freely move up and down, floating on top of the gas underneath and keeping it at a constant pressure. 15 May 1929 the Gasometer was first put into operation, with a maximum capacity of 347,000m³, a height of 117.5m and diameter of 67.6m.

During World War II, the Gasometer was hit by bombs several times, but kept operating. When it was shelled by allied forces it did not explode, but the gas burned up and the pressure disc slowly descended. The Gasometer officially stopped operating 31 December 1944. It was completely disassembled after it had caught fire during repair work on 10 June 1946. Reconstruction began 1949 using the original pressure disc and roof. By 1 June 1950 the Gasometer was operational again.

In 1977 the Gasometer was repainted, at a cost of 3.5 million DM. In later years many coking plants and iron works closed, reducing supply as well as demand for the gas stored in the Gasometer. In addition, natural gas became cheaper. The Gasometer became superfluous and in 1988 it was decommissioned by its owner, Ruhrkohle AG.

A discussion ensued about the dismantling or possible reuse of the Gasometer. In 1992 the city council of Oberhausen, with a margin of 1 vote decided to acquire the building and convert it to an exhibition space. At the time, plans were being developed for building shopping mall (CentrO) on an adjacent plot, and Internationale Bauausstellung Emscher Park planned to use the Gasometer for its exhibition. Ownership transferred to the city of Oberhausen, with Ruhrkohle AG paying 1.8 million DM in saved demolition costs to the city.

Conversion and restoration were done by Deutsche Babcock AG in 1993–1994. The former pressure disc was fixed at 4.5m height, with a 3000m² exhibition space on the ground floor below. The main exhibition space, on top of the pressure disc, was fitted with a stage and seating for 500 people. Lifts and stairs were fitted to provide visitors access to the roof. Conversion cost approximately DM 16 million.

Exhibitions

Fire & Flame (1994–1995)
The exhibition "Fire and Flame" documented the history of the coal and iron industry in the Ruhr area and its influence on society. It attracted about 460,000 visitors.

I Phoenix (1996)
"I Phoenix" was an exhibition of contemporary art. It attracted 96,000 visitors.

The Dream of Vision (1997)
The exhibition "The Dream of Vision"  dealt with the history of television.

Christo: The Wall (1999)
"The Wall" was organised as part of the IBA Emscher Park, at a cost of nearly 4 million DM. It was an installation by Christo and Jeanne-Claude, consisting of a stack of 13,000 oil drums in 7 colours, 68m wide, 26m high, and 7m deep, and weighed 234,000 kg. It attracted 390,000 visitors.

The Ball is Round (2000)
This exhibition was organised for the centenary of the German Football Association in 2000, and documented the history of football. It had 216,000 visitors.

Blue Gold (2001-2002)
"Blue Gold" dealt with the subject of water. It included 833,000 kg of sand. An installation by Paul Schütze included a 50m high cone of water in an artificial lake, and video projections.

Bill Viola: Five Angels for the Millennium (2003)
This was a video installation by Bill Viola. It had 140,000 visitors.

Wind of Hope (2004)

Fire Light Sky (2006)

"Fire Light Sky" was an installation of sound and light by Christina Kubisch, combined with an exhibition about the history of the Gasometer.

The Eye in the Sky (2007-2008)
This exhibition was a cooperation with DLR. It showed large satellite images of the earth and various objects to do with space exploration. It had 375,000 visitors.

Out of this World – Wonders of the Solar System (2009–2010)

This exhibition about space and the solar system was organised to mark the International Year of Astronomy. It was a project of Ruhr.2010 and ran from 2 April 2009 till 30 December 2010. Part of the show was a model of the Moon, 25m in diameter. 950,000 people visited the exhibition.

Magic Places (2011–2012)
This was an exhibition about natural and cultural monuments of the world. It had 800,000 visitors.

Christo: Big Air Package (2013)
"Big Air Package" (16 March 2013 – 30 December 2013) was one of the last three projects started by Christo with Jeanne-Claude, before Jeanne-Claude's death in 2009. It consisted of an envelope made of 20,350m² of semitransparent fabric and 4,500m of rope, weighing 5,300 kg. Inflated to a volume of 177,000m³, it was 90m high, 50m wide and was pressurised at 27 pascal over atmospheric pressure by two fans. Visitors could enter the installation through airlocks, and walk around inside the Gasometer.

The Appearance of Beauty (2014–2015)
This exhibition showed the variety of beauty in art with almost 200 works as plaster casts or large-format photo prints from the Venus de Milo to McCurry's Afghan Girl. It had 480,000 visitors.

References

External links
 Gasometer official site

European Route of Industrial Heritage Anchor Points
Buildings and structures completed in 1929
Buildings and structures in Oberhausen
Tourist attractions in Oberhausen
Museums in North Rhine-Westphalia
Art museums and galleries in Germany
Gas holders
1929 establishments in Germany